Heart Like a Hurricane is the second studio album by the American country music singer Larry Stewart and second release after his 1991 departure from the band Restless Heart. Three singles were released from this album: "Heart Like a Hurricane", "Losing Your Love" and "Rockin' the Rock". Although none of the three fell entered the Top 40 on the Billboard US country charts, "Losing Your Love" was a #21 on the RPM country charts in Canada. Ty Herndon recorded "She Wants to Be Wanted Again" on his 1996 album Living in a Moment and released it as a single that year. "Losing Your Love" was originally recorded by Vince Gill (who co-wrote it) on his 1987 album The Way Back Home.

Track listing
"Heart Like a Hurricane" (Trey Bruce, Craig Wiseman) – 4:03
"Losing Your Love" (Vince Gill, Hank DeVito, Kye Fleming) – 4:53
"She Wants to Be Wanted Again" (Billy Henderson, Steven Dale Jones) – 3:28
"It's How Deep" (James Dean Hicks, John Schweers) – 3:35
"Mama Needs Someone to Hold Her" (Hicks, Marc Beeson) – 3:16
"One Track Mind" (Bob DiPiero, Matt Rollings, Harry Stinson) – 3:36
"Real Life Love" (Kent Blazy, Neil Thrasher, Kelly Shiver) – 3:25
"Try Being Me" (Tim Mensy) – 3:58
"Rockin' the Rock" (Gary Burr) – 2:27
"I'm Not Through Lovin' You" (Gary Nicholson, Larry Stewart) – 3:51

Personnel

 Gary Burr - background vocals
 J.T. Corenflos - acoustic guitar, electric guitar
 Dan Dugmore - steel guitar
 Stuart Duncan - fiddle
 Paul Franklin - steel guitar
 Vince Gill - background vocals
 Rob Hajacos - fiddle
 Dann Huff - electric guitar, gut string guitar
 John Barlow Jarvis - keyboards, piano
 Terry McMillan - percussion, tambourine
 Carl Marsh - fairlight
 Brent Mason - electric guitar
 Steve Nathan - organ
 Don Potter - acoustic guitar
 Michael Rhodes - bass guitar
 John Wesley Ryles - background vocals
 Larry Stewart - lead vocals, background vocals
 Harry Stinson - background vocals
 Billy Thomas - background vocals
 Cindy Richardson-Walker - background vocals
 Dennis Wilson - background vocals
 Lonnie Wilson - drums

References
[ Heart Like a Hurricane] at Allmusic

Albums produced by Scott Hendricks
Columbia Records albums
Larry Stewart (singer) albums
1994 albums